Charlie Chan Carries On is a 1931 American pre-Code mystery film directed by Hamilton MacFadden and starring Warner Oland, John Garrick and Marguerite Churchill. It is the first appearance of Warner Oland as Charlie Chan. Part of the long-running Charlie Chan series, it was based on the 1930 novel of the same title by Earl Derr Biggers. It is now considered a lost film; however, Fox simultaneously filmed a Spanish-language version which was released under the title Eran Trece—There Were Thirteen—and this version survives.

Plot

Charlie Chan tries to solve the murder of a wealthy American found dead in a London hotel room. Settings include London, Nice, France, San Remo, Honolulu and Hong Kong.

Cast
 Warner Oland as Charlie Chan  
 John Garrick as Mark Kenaway  
 Marguerite Churchill as Pamela Potter  
 Warren Hymer as Max Minchin  
 Marjorie White as Sadie  
 C. Henry Gordon as John Ross  
 William Holden as Patrick Tait 
 George Brent as Capt. Ronald Keane  
 Peter Gawthorne as Inspector Duff  
 John T. Murray as Dr. Lofton  
 Goodee Montgomery as Mrs. Benbow  
 Jason Robards Sr. as Walter Honeywood  
 Lumsden Hare as Inspector Hayley  
 Zeffie Tilbury as Mrs. Luce  
 Betty Francisco as Sybil Conway  
 Harry Beresford as Kent
 John Rogers as Martin

See also
 There Were Thirteen
The Amazing Chan and the Chan Clan

References

Bibliography
 Hanke, Ken. Charlie Chan at the Movies: History, Filmography, and Criticism. McFarland, 1990.

External links

1931 films
American black-and-white films
1931 mystery films
Films directed by Hamilton MacFadden
Fox Film films
Charlie Chan films
Films set in London
Lost American films
Films based on American novels
Films based on mystery novels
American multilingual films
American mystery films
1931 multilingual films
1931 lost films
1930s English-language films
1930s American films